Partizansky (masculine), Partizanskaya (feminine), or Partizanskoye (neuter) is the name of several rural localities in Russia:
Partizansky, Altai Krai, a settlement in Soloneshensky District of Altai Krai
Partizansky, name of several other rural localities
Partizanskaya (rural locality), a village in Gdovsky District of Pskov Oblast
Partizanskoye, Krasnoyarsk Krai, a selo in Partizansky District of Krasnoyarsk Krai
Partizanskoye, name of several other rural localities